Psych is an American crime/mystery dramedy television series that premiered on July 7, 2006 on USA Network, and aired its series finale on March 26, 2014. It stars James Roday as Shawn Spencer, who uses his eidetic memory with the observational and investigative skills that his father ingrained in him during childhood to fake being a psychic who consults with the Santa Barbara Police Department to solve cases, as well as running a psychic detective agency called Psych.  He is (reluctantly) helped in his charade by his best friend, Burton "Gus" Guster (Dulé Hill), and his father, Henry Spencer (Corbin Bernsen).  He generally works with police detectives Carlton Lassiter (Timothy Omundson) and Juliet O'Hara (Maggie Lawson) and under the direction of Police Chief Karen Vick (Kirsten Nelson).  Episodes usually begin with a flashback to Shawn's youth, showcasing one of Henry's lessons for his son. These lessons are typically used or applied later in the episode. During the run of Psych, 120 episodes aired. A two-hour TV movie based on the Psych series, titled Psych: The Movie, aired on December 7, 2017. A second TV movie based on the series, titled Psych 2: Lassie Come Home, premiered on Peacock on July 15, 2020. A third movie, titled Psych 3: This Is Gus, premiered on Peacock on November 18, 2021.

Series overview

Episodes

Season 1 (2006–07)

Season 2 (2007–08)

Season 3 (2008–09)

Season 4 (2009–10)

Season 5 (2010)

Season 6 (2011–12)

Season 7 (2013)

Psych: The Musical (2013)

Season 8 (2014)

Psych: The Movie (2017)

Psych 2: Lassie Come Home (2020)

Psych 3: This Is Gus (2021)

Notes 

† denotes a two-hour movie (with advertisements).

Ratings

References

External links
Episode list for "Psych" on IMDb
Psych Episode Guide on TV.com

Episodes
Lists of American crime drama television series episodes
Lists of American comedy-drama television series episodes
it:Episodi di Psych (prima stagione)